Samina Khalid Ghurki (Urdu: ثمینہ خالد گرکی; born 13 August 1956) is a Pakistani politician of the Pakistan Peoples Party (PPP).

Ghurki was born on 13 August 1956 in Lahore in Ghurki Arain Family, Punjab and completed her degree at Lahore College for Women in 1976. She was elected to the National Assembly for her first term in 2002 from the constituency of NA-130, the largest in Lahore. She was re-elected in 2008 from the same constituency. She was appointed Federal Minister of Special Education in the cabinet of Prime Minister Yousaf Raza Gilani, Federal Minister of Environment and later Federal Minister of National Integration and Heritage in the cabinet of Prime Minister Raja Pervez Ashraf.

Married Khalid Javaid Ghurki, Samina is the mother of two sons and two daughters. Her family funds the Ghurki Trust Teaching Hospital in Ghurki, Lahore. Her late husband was a former Member of Parliament. Other family members in politics include Farooq Ghurki (former Provincial Minister for Information and Technology), Arshad Ghurki, Muhammad Iqbal Ghurki (former Provincial Minister).

Her areas of legislative interests are Education, Environment, Local Government Affairs, Culture and Women Affairs. She was among the 9 MPs to sign the United Nations Development Fund for Women's (UNIFEM) "say no to violence against women" campaign in New York. She was appointed as president of PPP Punjab Women Wing.

References

External links 
 UNIFEM campaign
 Profile
 Cabinet Expansion
 An interview
 Official WebSite of Samain Khalid Ghurki

Pakistan People's Party politicians
1956 births
Living people
Punjabi people
Lahore College for Women University alumni
Government of Yousaf Raza Gillani
Women members of the National Assembly of Pakistan
Women federal ministers of Pakistan